Peter Reid (26 November 1910 – 16 August 1939) was a Scottish chess player and mountain climber.

Biography
Peter Reid born in the family of solicitor), who later worked in Georgetown (British Guiana). He graduated from the University of Cambridge. After graduation, he lived in Edinburgh. A year before his death, Peter Reid returned to London. He worked as an insurance agent in the company Standard Life Assurance Company. Preparing to get a profession actuary and passed the entrance exam at the Institute of Actuaries in London.

While studying at Cambridge, Peter Reid was the secretary of the University Chess club. Later he was one of the strongest Scottish chess players in the 1930s.

Peter Reid played for Scotland in the Chess Olympiad:
 In 1937, at fourth board in the 7th Chess Olympiad in Stockholm (+3, =3, -11).

Peter Reid was an experienced mountain climber. He died while climbing Mount An-Cioch, located in an array of Coolin Hills on the Isle of Skye in the Inner Hebrides archipelago. While climbing the steep slope, Reed, who was the first to go, fell from a height of 70 feet and fell onto a small platform. Rescuers who arrived at the scene of the accident found Reed already dead.

References

External links

Peter Reid chess games at 365chess.com

1910 births
1939 deaths
People from Orpington
Alumni of the University of Cambridge
Scottish chess players
Chess Olympiad competitors
Scottish mountain climbers
20th-century chess players
Deaths from falls
Mountaineering deaths
Sport deaths in Scotland